Pat Spence and Elizabeth Ryan were the defending champions, but Spence did not participate. Ryan partnered with Colin Gregory, but lost in the semifinals to Ian Collins and Joan Fry.

Frank Hunter and Helen Wills defeated Collins and Fry in the final, 6–1, 6–4 to win the mixed doubles tennis title at the 1929 Wimbledon Championships.

Seeds

  Henri Cochet /  Eileen Bennett (quarterfinals)
  Frank Hunter /  Helen Wills (champions)
  Colin Gregory /  Elizabeth Ryan (semifinals)
  Jean Borotra /  Kea Bouman (quarterfinals)

Draw

Finals

Top half

Section 1

Section 2

Bottom half

Section 3

Section 4

References

External links

X=Mixed Doubles
Wimbledon Championship by year – Mixed doubles